The Vault of Horror (otherwise known as Vault of Horror, Further Tales from the Crypt and Tales from the Crypt II) is a 1973 British anthology horror film directed by Roy Ward Baker, and starring Terry-Thomas, Dawn Addams, Denholm Elliott, Curd Jürgens, Tom Baker, Michael Craig, Terence Alexander, Glynis Johns, Mike Pratt, Robin Nedwell, Geoffrey Davies, Daniel Massey and Anna Massey. 

None of the film's stories are actually from Vault of Horror comics. All but one appeared in Tales from the Crypt, the exception being from Shock SuspenStories. The film omits the Vault Keeper character from the comics.

Plot 
Intro

Five strangers board a descending lift, one by one, in a modern office block in London. They reach the sub-basement, though none of them have pressed for that destination. There they find a large, elaborately furnished room that appears to be a gentlemen's club. The lift door has closed; there are no buttons to bring it back, nor any other exit. Resigned to waiting for help, they settle down with drinks and talk. The conversation turns to dreams, and each man tells of a recurring nightmare.

"Midnight Mess" (Tales from the Crypt #35)

Harold Rogers tracks his sister Donna to a strange village, and kills her to claim her share of the family inheritance. After settling down to a post-murder meal at the local restaurant, he discovers the town is home to a nest of vampires: Donna is not as dead as he thinks, and he becomes the dish of the night when his jugular vein is tapped out as a beverage dispenser (this last scene is blacked-out in the U.S. DVD release).

"The Neat Job" (Shock SuspenStories #1)

The obsessively neat Arthur Critchit marries Eleanor, a "young" trophy wife who is not quite the housekeeper he hoped for. His constant nagging about the mess she makes eventually drives her mad. Upon his shouting at her, "Can't you do anything neatly? Can't you?", she finally snaps and kills him with a hammer, then cuts up the corpse and puts all the different organs into neatly labelled jars.

"This Trick’ll Kill You" (Tales from the Crypt #33)

Sebastian is a magician on a working holiday in India, where he and his wife Inez are searching for new tricks. Nothing impresses until he sees a girl charming a rope out of a basket with a flute. Unable to work out how the trick is done, he persuades her to come to his hotel room, where he and his wife murder her and steal the enchanted rope. Sebastian plays the flute, and the rope rises; realizing that they have discovered a piece of genuine magic, the couple begin plans to work it into their act. Inez experiments with climbing the rope, only to disappear with a scream. An ominous patch of blood appears on the ceiling, and the rope coils round Sebastian's neck and hangs him. Their victim reappears alive in the bazaar.

"Bargain in Death" (Tales from the Crypt #28)

Maitland is buried alive as part of an insurance scam concocted with his friend Alex. Alex double-crosses Maitland, leaving him to suffocate. Two trainee doctors, Tom and Jerry, bribe a gravedigger to dig up a corpse to help with their studies. When Maitland's coffin is opened, he jumps up gasping for air, scaring Tom and Jerry who run out into the middle of the road in front of Alex's car, which crashes into a tree and explodes. The gravedigger kills Maitland, and when trying to close the sale of the corpse apologizes to Tom and Jerry for the damage to the head.

"Drawn and Quartered" (Tales from the Crypt #26)

Moore is an impoverished painter living in Haiti. When he learns that his paintings have been sold for high prices by art dealers Diltant and Gaskill after being praised by critic Fenton Breedley, all of whom told him that they were worthless, he goes to a voodoo priest and his painting hand is given voodoo power; whatever he paints or draws can be harmed by damaging its image. Rather awkwardly, these events coincide with his completing a self-portrait, which he keeps under lock and key to prevent the magic from turning on him. Returning to London, Moore paints portraits of the three men who cheated him, and mutilates the paintings to exact his revenge. He is also obliged to put his own portrait out in the open, because leaving it in an airless strongbox nearly suffocated him. A workman subsequently drops a can of paint thinner on the picture through a skylight, and Moore, as a result of the voodoo, suffers a correspondingly messy death.

Finale

When the story of the final dream is told, the five ponder the meaning of their nightmares. The lift door opens, and they find themselves looking out onto a graveyard. Rogers, Critchit, Maitland, and Moore walk out into the graveyard and disappear one by one. Sebastian remains behind and explains that they are all damned souls compelled to tell the stories of their evil deeds for all eternity. He then turns back into the room, which is now a mausoleum, walks towards the casket and disappears himself. Then the door slams shut.

Cast
Daniel Massey as Harold Rogers
Terry-Thomas as Arthur Critchit
Curd Jürgens as Sebastian
Michael Craig as Maitland
Tom Baker as Moore
Anna Massey as Donna Rogers
Glynis Johns as Eleanor Critchit
Dawn Addams as Inez
Edward Judd as Alex
Denholm Elliott as Diltant
Robin Nedwell as Tom
Geoffrey Davies as Jerry
Terence Alexander as Fenton Breedley
John Witty as Arthur Gaskill
Jasmina Hilton as Indian Girl
Ishaq Bux as Fakir
John Forbes-Robertson as Wilson
Maurice Kaufmann as Bob Dickson
Arthur Mullard as Gravedigger
Mike Pratt as Clive
Marianne Stone as Jane
Erik Chitty as Old Waiter
Tommy Godfrey as Landlord
Jerold Wells as Waiter

Production
In the segment "Bargain in Death", Maitland can be seen reading a copy of the novelisation of the earlier Amicus film Tales from the Crypt (1972). The same installment features Geoffrey Davies and Robin Nedwell, who both appeared in the British TV show Doctor in the House. "Midnight Mess" features a brother and sister as characters. They are played by real-life brother and sister Anna Massey and Daniel Massey, whose father was actor Raymond Massey.

Filming
The film was shot on location and at Twickenham Studios.
The tower featured in the opening scenes is the Millbank Tower in London.

Release

Reception
Roger Greenspun of The New York Times was dismissive, writing that of the several distinguished actors who appeared in the film, "none is ever quite so bad as the material warrants." Variety wrote, "Quality for the material is uneven, ranging from camp comedy to the belabored grotesque ... Performances, given the limited nature of the script, are above par for this sort of exercise." Kevin Thomas of the Los Angeles Times called the film "a very tepid, static affair despite the presence of many luminaries of the English stage and screen." Tom Milne of The Monthly Film Bulletin wrote that the film was "even less satisfactory" than Tales from the Crypt, "mainly because the Freddie Francis atmospherics have been replaced by pedantically flat direction by Roy Ward Baker in which each story plods squarely through yards of exposition before erupting in all too brief explosions of Grand Guignol."

Halliwell's Film Guide described the film as "plainly but well staged." Jeremy Aspinall of Radio Times gave the film three stars out of five, describing it as a "suitably ghoulish companion piece to the excellent Tales from the Crypt", "fiendishly fun", with "a touch of class in the cast", concluding "if you like your fright fables darkly droll, then this should certainly do the trick."

DVD and Blu-ray releases

Together with Tales from the Crypt, The Vault of Horror was released on a Midnite Movies double feature DVD on 11 September 2007. The version used is the edited U.S. theatrical PG re-release (the original theatrical release in the U.S. was the unedited R-rated version), which replaces some of the gorier scenes with still images (notably the final shot of "Midnight Mess" showing Daniel Massey's neck being tapped for blood, and Terry Thomas dropping from a hammer blow in "The Neat Job") to receive an MPAA PG rating. The U.K. Vipco DVD release featured the original unedited U.K. print.

An uncensored version was first shown on the British TV channel Film4 on 25 August 2008, and later released by Scream Factory on a double-feature Blu-ray with Tales From The Crypt. Questions have been raised as to if these prints are still missing a scene in which the characters who walk to the graveyard are seen with dead, skeletal faces. It may be that this shot has been lost; no prints containing it have ever surfaced, and there is no evidence it was ever included in the final release prints, as even the original unedited prints that have surfaced do not include a scene resembling the photo. It also has been widely speculated that the image was just a photo taken for promotional purposes and was never a filmed scene, as Curd Jürgens' character is portrayed by a different actor in the photo. Jürgens' character is the main focus of the end sequence; hence, some have stated that a scene is unlikely to have been filmed with a different actor portraying the character, for audiences would have noticed the change.

References

External links 
 
 

1970s English-language films
1973 films
1973 horror films
Amicus Productions films
British horror anthology films
British sequel films
British supernatural horror films
British vampire films
Films about magic
Films about magic and magicians
Films about Voodoo
Films based on American comics
Films directed by Roy Ward Baker
Films scored by Douglas Gamley
Films shot at Twickenham Film Studios
Live-action films based on comics
Mariticide in fiction
Sororicide in fiction
Tales from the Crypt films
1970s British films